D'Angelo Wallace (born August 29, 1998) is an American YouTube commentator, known for his videos of controversial YouTubers and Internet personalities. He received a degree from Our Lady of the Lake University in 2018, and is based in San Antonio. Insider described Wallace as "a cancellation catalyst, pouring gasoline on outrage directed at internet stars".

His commentary style has been compared to other YouTube commentators such as Cody Ko, Danny Gonzalez, Drew Gooden, and Kurtis Conner although his content has often balanced or combined trivia associated with YouTube commentary channels with more hard-hitting topics.

YouTube career

Main channel
Wallace's original channel (mainly talking about art and related topics) began in 2018, and gained 100,000 subscribers in a year.

Currently, Social Blade estimates that Wallace could earn more than $300,000 per year from his two channels. In October 2020, it was revealed that Wallace was nominated for a YouTube Streamy Award.

Second channel
Wallace started a second channel in 2020 to talk about non-art-related subjects. On this channel, which has since grown larger than the first, Wallace provides social commentary on YouTubers and influencers, as well as pop culture and general entertainment. One of his notable earlier videos included a discussion over the YouTube channel "Spill", a channel which discussed YouTube drama, and as to whether it was run by an individual or a corporation (the channel later said it was run by a corporation).

On Cuties
His first video to be featured on YouTube's "Trending" tab was a critique of Cuties, a film which he claimed encouraged child exploitation. The film had been the subject of a broader "culture wars" controversy in the United States.

Dramageddon
In July 2020, Wallace was "one of the loudest voices holding [Internet personalities Jeffree Star and Shane Dawson] accountable for their past behavior" and produced a three video series – first on Star, then Dawson – deconstructing the role each played in the controversy between beauty gurus James Charles and Tati Westbrook. The final video in the series explores the role Tati Westbrook played in the situation from her initial Bye Sister video from 2019, and the follow up Breaking My Silence in 2020. Wallace's criticism of Dawson and Star's role in the controversy, known as Dramageddon, was praised for its extensive documentation of facts and evidence, and shaped "how millions of YouTube fans now view the three beauty gurus and their drama". Following his video on Dawson (the second video in the series), Wallace's subscriber count went from 630,000 to 1 million. As of March 2021, his subscriber count across his two channels was 3.28 million.

However, in April 2021 Wallace is in the process of removing the videos from his channel since, due to new disclosures, including misconduct accusations against James Charles from the month prior, he does not consider them to paint a clear and complete picture anymore.

Influencer-19
He has been critical of the action of some social media influencers during the COVID-19 pandemic, with his video Influencer-19, published on February 1, 2021, being highly critical of those who broke public health and safety restrictions enacted because of the pandemic.

Works
Information on Wallace's latest works on the channel of his on which he posts long-form in-depth analyses of internet controversies and controversial people, dangelowallace, follows:

Notes

References

1998 births
Living people
American YouTubers
Commentary YouTubers
African-American media personalities
Our Lady of the Lake University alumni
21st-century African-American people